Stavros Vasilantonopoulos (born 28 January 1992) is a Greek professional footballer who plays as a right-back for Super League club Lamia.

Career

Vasilantonopoulos started his career playing for Panachaiki, before he joined Apollon Smyrnis playing in Football League for the 2014–15 season. On 30 June 2016, he joined Veria on a season-long loan. He made 28 appearances, but the club couldn't avoid relegation. On 26 June 2017, he was loaned again to newly promoted Superleague club Lamia. On 29 October 2017, he scored his first two goals in a 2–0 home win against Platanias. The 25-year old has made some solid performances in the first half of the 2017–18 season and AEK is keeping tabs on him.

On 31 May 2018, Vasilantonopoulos agreed to a contract extension with AEK, until the summer of 2020.

On 4 July 2018, his loan to Lamia was extended by an additional year.

On 3 March 2020, he was loaned out to Ekstraklasa club Górnik Zabrze for the remainder of the current football season. On 6 March 2020, in his debut he scored the winning goal with a wonderful kick after Jesús Jiménez's assist in a 3–2 home win game against Cracovia.

On 23 June 2021, he signed a two-year contract with Atromitos.

Career statistics

Honours

 AEK Athens
 Greek Cup: 2015–16

References

External links
 

1992 births
Living people
Greek footballers
Greek expatriate footballers
Super League Greece players
Football League (Greece) players
Ekstraklasa players
Panachaiki F.C. players
Apollon Smyrnis F.C. players
AEK Athens F.C. players
Veria F.C. players
Panegialios F.C. players
PAS Lamia 1964 players
Górnik Zabrze players
Association football defenders
Expatriate footballers in Poland
Footballers from Aigio